Ferdinand Charles may refer to:

Ferdinand Charles, Archduke of Further Austria (1628–1662), ruler of Further Austria
Ferdinand Charles, Duke of Mantua and Montferrat (1652–1708), ruler of the Duchy of Mantua
Ferdinand Charles of Austria-Este (1754–1806), son of Empress Maria Theresa
Archduke Ferdinand Karl Joseph of Austria-Este (1781–1850)
Archduke Ferdinand Karl Viktor of Austria-Este (1821–1849)
Ferdinand Charles of Bourbon-Parma (1823–1854), crown-prince of Lucca, later Duke Charles III of Parma
Archduke Ferdinand Karl of Austria (1868–1915), son of Archduke Karl Ludwig of Austria
Ferdinand Charles Stanley (1871–1935), son of Frederick Stanley, 16th Earl of Derby
Ferdinand Charles, comte d'Aspremont-Lynden (1689–1772), soldier

See also
Charles Ferdinand, Duke of Berry (1778–1820), son of Charles X of France